The Parque Central Complex is a housing, commercial and cultural development, implemented by Centro Simón Bolívar and located in the area known as El Conde in the center of the city of Caracas, Venezuela adjacent to Paseo Vargas.

Within the complex are the Twin Towers of Parque Central which are two skyscrapers that, for decades, have become Caracas' architectural icon. From 1979 (when the West Tower was opened) until 2003, they held the title of tallest skyscrapers in Latin America until they were overtaken by Torre Mayor in Mexico City. Today (as of April 2020) the Parque Central Towers are South America's 6th tallest skyscrapers and the 22nd tallest in Latin America, after Torres Obispado in Monterrey, Gran Torre Santiago in Santiago (Chile), and many buildings in Panama City, Mexico City, and Balneário Camboriú. Parque Central towers were the tallest twin buildings in Latin America, now the 281 m high Edifício Yachthouse in Balneário Camboriú - Brazil, owns the title.

When the complex was finally opened in 1983, it was considered the "most important urban development in Latin America". Since then Parque Central is a point of reference in Caracas and its main landmark. It houses many cultural and government institutions and is adjacent to the cultural district of museums in Caracas.

History 
In 1969, Enrique Delfino Arriens engineer and CEO of the construction Delpre CA submitted the draft to the president of Central Park Centro Simón Bolívar during the period of the then President of the Republic Rafael Caldera for the construction of an urban development between Lecuna and Bolivar avenues of urbanization El Conde de Caracas.

In 1970, construction of the Tacagua, Caroata, Catuche, Tajamar, San Martín, El Tejar, Anauco and Mohedano towers were underway, and all these eight buildings for residential use with 317 apartaments each, a height of 127 meters and 44 floors, these buildings are finished build 1972, while two commercial and office towers, known as Central Park Towers, were constructed in 1979 and 1983. The building Anauco apart-hotel became a 4 star Hilton in 1973 until 2003, since then is administered by the Venezuelan government and is known as Anauco Suites.

Within the Central Park complex also houses the Museo de Arte Contemporaneo de Caracas, The Children's Museum of Caracas, The Plenary Hall, 8 conference rooms, a swimming academy, movie theaters, a heliport, a parish center, among others.

Delfino also constructed the Complejo Cultural Teatro Teresa Carreño.

The Twin Towers 
The Twin Towers of Central Park or Central Park Towers are a pair of 225 m tall skyscrapers.  Since the construction of the west tower in 1979, until the construction of Torre Gran Costanera in Santiago (topped out in 2012), the 59 storey skyscrapers had been the tallest in South America. The east tower wasn't completed until 1983.  Until 2003, they were also the tallest in Latin America until surpassed - by less than 1 m - by Torre Mayor in Mexico City.

The towers take their name from the green refuge in the heart of Caracas' urban jungle, but are still in the midst of a vast complex of office buildings and amenities. The view from inside offers panoramic access to the city and the surrounding mountains.

On February 14, 1982, high rise firefighting and rescue advocate, Dan Goodwin, at the invitation of the Venezuelan television company, Venevisión, scaled the outside of the Parque Central Complex.

Fire 
Just before midnight, October 17, 2004, a fire broke out in the East Tower, which housed government offices. The fire affected regions from the 34th floor to the 50th floor. The tower sustained major damage because firefighting efforts were hampered by non-working automatic sprinkler and standpipe systems. It was feared that the concrete-and-steel structure could be damaged severely enough to collapse, and internal firefighting efforts were pulled in the interest of safety. Two steel decks partially collapsed, and deflection in some steel beams was later found to be severe. The fire burned itself out in the early morning of October 19.

Nine years later, on November 12, 2013 there was a minor fire in the West Tower, the fire was on the 16th floor, which 420 people were evacuated and 15 were rescued, no fatalities. The fire was immediately controlled so that it did not affect the upper floors of the tower. Fire Department officials presumed that the fire occurred in a trash chute.

Restoration of the East Tower 
Within the recovery plan the East Tower was installed at the end of 2012 an antenna represents the sword of Simón Bolívar. This element will be illuminated with patriotic colors: yellow, blue and red become a new landmark of the city of Caracas. The antenna has a height of 30 meters, a factor that increases the height of the tower to 255 meters.

By 2014, the District Capital Corporation          (Corpocapital), said that will be enabled 48 floors of the tower and 5 floors that run a resort of reference in the capital. The resort will feature a convention hall, restaurants and an observation deck to be located on the floor 53.

See also
List of tallest buildings in South America
List of tallest twin buildings and structures in the world
Centro Simón Bolívar Towers

References

External links

Emporis.com
 Photos of the Parque Central Complex

Buildings and structures completed in 1979
Buildings and structures completed in 1983
Skyscrapers in Venezuela
Buildings and structures in Caracas
Twin towers
Skyscraper office buildings in Venezuela
Residential skyscrapers